Gotteszell is a municipality in the district of Regen in Bavaria in Germany.

See also
Gotteszell–Blaibach railway

References

Regen (district)